Patescospora is a genus of fungi in the Aliquandostipitaceae family. This is a monotypic genus, containing the single species Patescospora separans.

References

External links
 

Jahnulales
Monotypic Dothideomycetes genera